Winnie-the-Pooh Meets the Queen (e-book edition published as Winnie-the-Pooh and the Royal Birthday)  is a 2016 children's book written to celebrate the 90th birthdays of both the fictional character Winnie-the-Pooh and Queen Elizabeth II in 2016. The Queen celebrated her 90th Official Birthday on 11 June, although her actual birthday is 21 April 1926. The first Winnie-the-Pooh book, written by A. A. Milne, was published in October 1926. This original story imagines a meeting between Pooh and Queen Elizabeth at Buckingham Palace. The text was written by Jane Riordan while illustrations were by Mark Burgess in the style of the original drawings by E. H. Shepard.

Background 

The story was originally available as an audio-video download narrated by the actor Jim Broadbent. Broadbent said "I have been a fan of Winnie-the-Pooh since I was a boy. In fact I named my very first and much loved teddy Pooh and that can only have been after the A. A. Milne character". The print version followed in November 2016. A. A. Milne dedicated a 1926 book of songs featuring Pooh, “Teddy Bear and Other Songs", to the newborn then-Princess Elizabeth. As a little girl, Princess Elizabeth was also presented with a hand-painted Christopher Robin tea set. A PDF e-book version was also released by Disney. In this edition, Jane Riordan is not credited as author.

Plot 

Christopher Robin informs Winnie-the-Pooh, Piglet, Eeyore, Rabbit, Tigger, and Kanga that Queen Elizabeth II is about to celebrate her 90th birthday. The toys discuss the need for a very special present to mark the occasion. Pooh comes up with a hum that everyone agrees would make a charming gift. They take a bus from Victoria station and enjoy such iconic London sights as Piccadilly and Trafalgar Square. The Queen happens to be out for a stroll in front of Buckingham Palace, allowing Pooh the opportunity to deliver the hum in person.

Prince George of Wales

Prince George has an appearance in the story when Piglet presents him with a red balloon. George is not named but is described as “much younger than Christopher Robin and almost as bouncy as Tigger”.

References

External links
 Free e-book edition

2016 children's books
2016 British novels
British children's novels
Cultural depictions of Elizabeth II
Winnie-the-Pooh books
Books about bears
Pigs in literature
Books about tigers
Books about United Kingdom royalty
Egmont Books books